Ephrata was a village located within the Bakkie resort of the Commewijne District of Suriname.

Ephrata started as a sugar plantation, and had been documented as early as 20 November 1708. The plantation is located on the Cottica River. The surname "van Ephrata" (English: from Ephrata) is often used by Boni Maroons.

References

Former populated places in Suriname